Lawn bowls at the Pacific Games (known as the South Pacific Games until 2009) was introduced as a tournament for men's and women in 1979 at the 1979 South Pacific Games.

Past winners
There have been six editions of lawn bowls at the Games.

Men's titles

Women's titles

References

 
Pacific Games